WBKQ (96.7 FM, "Blake FM") is a radio station licensed to Alexandria, Indiana. It serves the Muncie area and is owned by Woof Boom Radio Muncie License, LLC and airs a new country music format.

External links

BKQ
Country radio stations in the United States
Radio stations established in 1980
1980 establishments in Indiana